Nanjangud, officially known as Nanjanagudu, is a town in the Mysuru district of Indian state of Karnataka. Nanjangud lies on the banks of the river Kapila (also called Kabini), 23 km from the city of Mysore. Nanjangud is famous for the Srikanteshwara Temple located here. Nanjangud is also called Dakshina Kashi (southern Kashi). This town is also famous for a type of banana grown in the region called the Nanjanagoodu rasabale. Nanjangud's local administrative unit was designated as a Municipal Committee in 2015 by including Devirammanahalli and Kallahalli village.

Origin of the name
The Srikanteshwara Temple at Nanjangud is dedicated to the Hindu supreme deity Shiva, also called Sri Nanjundeshwara, (The Lord who drank poison).  Nanjanagud literally means "the place where Nanja (Nanjundeshwara) resides" in Kannada..

History
Nanjangud has been a major Shaiva centre for nearly a thousand years. Chola Kings in the 11th – 12th century are considered to have built this temple with significant additions by the Hoysalas and the Vijayanagara kings. This temple was later renovated by the Hoysala kings. The Wodeyar kings of Mysore made various grants to renovate the temple.

The state general secretary in Karnataka of Hindu Mahasabha, Dharmendra, threatened to kill Karnataka Chief Minister Basavaraj Bommai for the temple demolitions, resulting in his and several party officials' arrest.

Geography

It has an average elevation of 657 metres (2155 ft). The taluk borders Mysore taluk of Mysore district to the north, T Narsipur taluk of Mysore district to the east, H D Kote taluk of Mysore district to the west and Gundlupet and Chamarajanagar taluks of Chamarajanagar district to the south.

Getting there
Nanjanagud is 24 km from Mysuru and 165 km from Bengaluru Via NH766. Buses are available from Bengaluru, Mysuru city by city bus and Chamarajanagar. The nearest airport is Mysore Airport situated at Mandakalli at a distance of 16 km from Nanjangud and 10 km from Mysuru.

Nanjangud has two railway stations - the Nanjangud Town railway station and the Sujathapuram railway station. Usually only slow trains stop here, except the Chamarajanagar-Tirupati express train.

Places to see

Nanjundeshwara Temple

This temple is the most famous attraction of the town. It is believed that sage Gauthama stayed here for some time and installed a Lingam, the idol form of Shiva.

Parashurama Kshetra

Near Nanjangud is the confluence of the Kapila and Kaundinya rivers. This place is termed as Parashurama Kshetra where the sage Parashurama is said to have cleansed himself from the sin of beheading his mother.

Oldest bridge in India 

The bridge across the Kabini river has been declared as the oldest bridge with both a railway line and a road by the Government of India. It is located at the entrance of temple town here. 

The bridge, built in 1735, is now 283 years old and a Heritage Monument declared by the Government of India.

Guru Dataatreya Swamy Temple 

The Dattaatreya Temple is located near the Chamundeshwari Temple on the banks of River Kapila. The idols of Sri Maha Sharabheshwara and Sri Pratyangira Devi are also installed in this temple.

Hemmaragala Santhana Gopala Swamy Temple 
This temple is also known as Hemmaragala Huchu Gopala Santhana Venugopala Swamy or Koundinya Maharshi Kshetra.  It is located 13.3 km from the main Nanjangud Srikanteshwara temple. The main idol is called Tribhangi Kolalu Gopala. It is believed to be around 1800 years old and believed to grant children to childless couples. In the temple there are columns and pillars depicting the architecture of Vijayanagara era.

Other attractions

Scenic places within a 100 km radius of Nanjangud include Bandipur National Park, Shivsamudram Falls and the Kabini Reservoir.

Economy
Nanjangud is home to many industries which are mainly located in the Nanjangud Industrial Area which is spread across . It all started with the now closed Sujatha Textile Mills (STM) which at its peak used to employ about 3000 people. Since then, STM has closed down. However, there are other industries which thrived. There are 36 major industries, 12 medium industries and 35 small-scale units at Nanjangud. According to NIA, Nanjangud is the second highest tax-paying (sales tax of over Rs 400 crore a year) taluk in the State after Bangalore.

Sports
Football player N.S.Manju is originally from Nanjangud.

Nanjanagudu Banana

Nanjangud Rasabaale is a popular variety of the banana fruit, originating from the Devarasanahalli Village. The Nanjanagudu banana has been accorded Geographical Indication tag(GI), number 29. Kayyar Kinhanna Rai has authored a famous Kannada poem on the banana titled "Hannu Maruvavana Haadu".

Image gallery

Location

See also

 Hullahalli

Kadakola
 Golur Bridge
Thandavapura
Sujatha Puram Halt
Chinnada Gudi Hundi

References

External links

Cities and towns in Mysore district
Tourist attractions in Mysore district